Adelaide Oval is a sports ground in Adelaide, South Australia, located in the parklands between the city centre and North Adelaide. The venue is predominantly used for cricket and Australian rules football, but has also played host to rugby league, rugby union, soccer, tennis among other sports as well as regularly being used to hold concerts. Austadiums.com described Adelaide Oval as being "one of the most picturesque Test cricket grounds in Australia, if not the world." After the completion of the ground's most recent redevelopment in 2014, sports journalist Gerard Whateley described the venue as being "the most perfect piece of modern architecture because it's a thoroughly contemporary stadium with all the character that it's had in the past."

Adelaide Oval has been headquarters to the South Australian Cricket Association (SACA) since 1871 and South Australian National Football League (SANFL) since 2014. The stadium is managed by the Adelaide Oval Stadium Management Authority (AOSMA). Adelaide Oval has also hosted the AFLW Grand Final since 2019.

Development 

In 1871, the ground was established after the formation of South Australian Cricket Association.

During 1888, a switchback rollercoaster was constructed and was adjacent to Adelaide Oval where the present Riverbank Stand resides.

In 1900, a picket fence was put in place around Oval's playing surface.

In 1911, the current Adelaide Oval scoreboard, designed by architect Kenneth Milne, began service.

In 1990, the Sir Donald Bradman Stand was built to replace the John Creswell stand and provided up to date facilities for spectators.

In 1997, lights were constructed at the ground allowing sport to be held at night. This was the subject of a lengthy dispute with the Adelaide City Council relating to the parklands area. The first towers erected were designed to retract into the ground; however one collapsed and they were replaced with permanent towers.

In 2003, two grandstands, named the Chappell Stands, after the South Australian cricketing brothers Ian Chappell, Greg Chappell and Trevor Chappell were completed.

Temporary stands were constructed for the 2006 Ashes Series to cope with demand. In August 2008 the South Australian Cricket Association (SACA) announced that it had approved plans to redevelop the ground, involving expanding its capacity to 40,000. Development plans showed a reconfiguration of the playing surface and a remodelled western stand. The redevelopment would make the ground a viable option for hosting Australian Football League games as well as international soccer and rugby. The state and federal Governments each pledged $25m to the project, leaving the SACA to raise at least $45m. The SACA planned for the new stand to be ready in time for the 2010–11 Ashes series. The South Australian government announced it would commit funding to redevelop Adelaide Oval into a multi-purpose sports facility that would bring AFL football to central Adelaide. Announcing an agreement negotiated with SACA, SANFL and the AFL, the Rann Labor government committed $450 million to the project.

The three original western stands were demolished (George Giffen stand (1882), Sir Edwin Smith stand (1922), Mostyn Evan stand (1920s)) were torn down in June 2009 and a single Western stand was developed in its place ahead of the 2010–11 Ashes series. The Adelaide Oval Stadium Management Authority (AOSMA), a joint venture of SACA and the South Australian National Football League (SANFL), was registered as a company on 23 December 2009 following the re-announcement of the plan.  The AOSMA has eight directors, four associated with SACA (Ian McLachlan-Chair, John Harnden, Creagh O’Connor & John Bannon) and four with SANFL (Leigh Whicker-CEO, Rod Payze, Philip Gallagher & Jamie Coppins).

In 2010 the new Western stand was completed incorporating 14,000 individual seats and features improved shading conditions and amenities for SACA members. In the lead up to the 2010 state election, the opposition SA Liberals announced that, if elected, it would build with a new stadium with a roof, located at Riverside West at the site of the state government's new hospital location. The incumbent SA Labor government subsequently announced it would fund a $450 million upgrade and redevelopment of the whole of Adelaide Oval, rather than just the Western Grand Stand. Labor narrowly won re-election in 2010, resulting in its Adelaide Oval upgrade policy going ahead though eventually for a steeper $535 million, of which this deal included the State Government clearing the SACA's $85 million debt.

However, in early-mid-2010, prior to the election, it became clear that $450m would be inadequate. Following the 2010 state election, the Rann Labor government capped the State Government's commitment, stating: "It's $450 million – and not a penny more", and set a deadline for the parties to agree.  In May, Treasurer Kevin Foley announced that "the Government's final offer to the SANFL and SACA for the redevelopment" was $535 million, and the deadline was extended to August 2010. Simultaneously, the SACA and the SANFL were in the process of negotiating an agreement that would enable Australian Rules Football (AFL) to use Adelaide Oval during the AFL season as their home ground. In August 2010, SANFL and SACA representatives signed letters of intent committing to the project, including the capped $535 million offer from the state government.

The redevelopment included a $40 million pedestrian bridge across the River Torrens to link the Adelaide railway station precinct with the Adelaide Oval precinct, which was partially completed for the Ashes cricket series in December 2013 and fully completed ahead of the 2014 AFL season.

In early 2011, the AFL, SANFL, SACA, the SA Government and the Australian Government reached an agreement to upgrade Adelaide Oval. The SACA and the SANFL proposed, if SACA members vote yes on the upgrade in early May, that the whole Stadium will undergo redevelopment, except for the Northern Mound, the Moreton Bay Fig trees and the scoreboard, which will stay as it is because of it being under heritage listing. A three-quarters majority of SACA members were required to vote in favour of the proposed upgrade for it to ahead, with a successful vote resulting in the SANFL and AFL having control over the stadium for 7 months of the year and SACA having control for 5 months of the year.

SACA members had the choice of voting online on 28 April 2011 or attending in person an Extraordinary Meeting at the Adelaide Showgrounds on 2 May 2011. At 6 pm, 28 April 2011, It was announced that 60% of SACA members that voted online voted yes, 15% short of the majority vote needed for the upgrade to go ahead. At 10.15 pm, on 2 May 2011, at the Adelaide Showgrounds, the final result was announced. 80.37% of total votes cast were in favour of Adelaide Oval being redeveloped, resulting in the upgrade and stadium reconfiguration being approved. In 2012 the two grandstands, named the Chappell Stands, after the South Australian cricketing brothers Ian Chappell, Greg Chappell and Trevor Chappell along with the Sir Donald Bradman stand were demolished.

The upgrade commenced in April 2012. By 2014 the new Eastern Stand was fully completed with a total capacity of 19,000, bringing the overall seating capacity of the stadium to 50,083 in time for the 2014 AFL season.

All stands of the Oval were redeveloped and upgraded while the already rebuilt Western grandstand (SACA and SANFL members only stand) had modifications to improve sightlines for some seats and the addition of a new media center and AFL standard interchange benches, the Northern Mound had its seating capacity increased, and the Historic Scoreboard and the Moreton Bay fig trees remained untouched. The Northern Mound, the Moreton Bay fig trees and the Scoreboard are all heritage listed and will likely never be demolished unless damaged beyond repair. This is the only manual scoreboard still operating in major Australasian cricket venues. Due to the 10-letter limit, some names had to be truncated, or be replaced by nicknames. Following a vote by SACA members in favour of the redevelopment of the oval, the South Australian government increased its funding commitment to $535 million.

† Note that a 75% threshold was required in order for approval to be granted.

Layout

The oval dimensions were originally 190m x 125m, both unusually long and unusually narrow for an Australian cricket/football ground. The arrangement was highly favourable for batsmen who played square of the wicket, and heavily penalised bowlers who delivered the ball short or wide so that the batsman could play cut, hook or pull shots. Before the far ends in front of and behind the wicket were roped off, making the playing area shorter, it was not uncommon for batsmen to hit an all-run four or even occasionally a five.

Pitch 
The Adelaide Oval pitch runs north–south. Historically, Adelaide Oval's integral pitch was generally very good for batting, and offering little assistance to bowlers until the last day of a match. Since the redevelopment in 2013, a drop-in pitch has been used at the venue.

Oval 
With the 2011–2014 redevelopment completed, the oval dimensions changed to 183m x 134m, making it more suitable for Australian Rules Football, for which the playing field dimensions will be 167m x 124m.

The Hill 
The Hill was created in 1898 with earth from the banks of the River Torrens. The Hill for almost all sporting events at the ground is general admission and is often home to the most vocal supporters during cricket matches. The ease of people congregating on The Hill and the proximity to the Adelaide Oval Scoreboard bar is often cited as the reason why the most enthusiastic cricket supporters and barrackers choose The Hill to watch matches.

Scoreboard 

The current scoreboard located on The Hill was first used in 1911 and still shows its original Edwardian architecture. The scoreboard is listed on the City of Adelaide Heritage Register, helping to maintain the charm of the ground. There is a bar located under the scoreboard.

Members' stands 
The members' stands were the first section of the ground completed in the most recent redevelopment of Adelaide Oval. They retain significant portions of the original members' stand such as the brick archways and long room. The three segments are named after South Australian Cricket identities; from North to South named Sir Edwin Smith Stand, Sir Donald Bradman Pavilion and the Chappell Stand.

Riverbank stand 
The Riverbank stand is the southern stand of Adelaide Oval, gaining its name from the River Torrens which is behind it.

Eastern stands 
The Eastern Stands hold 19,000 spectators. The five segments are named after South Australian Australian rules football identities; from North to South named Gavin Wanganeen Stand, Jack Oatey Stand, Max Basheer Stand, Fos Williams Stand, and Mark Ricciuto Stand.

Cricket

International cricket 

Adelaide Oval hosts some of the many exciting events in the cricketing calendar – including the annual Australia Day One Day International on 26 January (replacing a traditional Australia Day test) and every 4 years, one of the 5 Ashes test matches against England. The tests are now normally held in early December and is a clash between Australia and the international touring team of that particular season. Adelaide Oval was the host of the first ever day/night Test match, when Australia played New Zealand on 27 November 2015.

In 2011, Adelaide Oval held its first Twenty20 International between Australia and England, a match which England won by 1 wicket. The ground was announced as one of the venues for the 2022 ICC Men's T20 World Cup, and will host one of the semi-finals.

Domestic cricket 
Adelaide Oval is the home ground for the first-class South Australian state cricket team, The West End Southern Redbacks and Twenty20 cricket team, the Adelaide Strikers. The Strikers compete in the Big Bash League. The Southern Redbacks compete in the Sheffield Shield and JLT One Day Cup' Cricket timeline 
 1873 December 13 – The first cricket game is played on the ground between Australian born players and players born overseas.
 1874 March 1 – England beat South Australia by 7 wickets in the first international cricket match at the ground.
 1874 November 7 – South Australia play Victoria on Adelaide Oval for the first time. Victoria won by 15 runs.
 1877 November 10 – The first first-class cricket match played at the ground was between South Australia and Tasmania. South Australia was victorious, winning by an innings and 13 runs.
 1878 January 30 – The first cricket century at the ground was scored by John Hill, 102 not out for North Adelaide against the Kent Club.
 1884 December 12 – The first Test match was played at the Oval. England beat Australia by eight wickets. (Scorecard)
 1894 January 15 – Albert Trott collected 8/43 on debut against England, the grounds best single-innings Test match bowling figure.
 1931 – Donald Bradman scored the highest Test score at the ground, 299 not out, against South Africa. Clarrie Grimmett collected the most Test wickets in a match at the ground, fourteen, against South Africa.
 1932 – The Bodyline affair reached its lowest point at the ground when Bill Woodfull and Bert Oldfield were struck, and on the third day mounted police patrolled to keep the 50,962 spectators in order (a record crowd for cricket at the ground). The total attendance for the match was 174,351.
 1946 – Arthur Morris of Australia, and Denis Compton of England both made centuries in both innings of the Test.
 1947 – Australia scored the highest team total in a test match at the ground, 674 runs, against India.
 1949 January 15 – The first women's test match held at the ground was between England and Australia. Australia would win by 186 runs.
 1960 – Australia played the West Indies in the fourth test of the Frank Worrell Trophy. The match ended in a draw, with the West Indies unable to take the final wicket of the fourth innings, as the last batsmen Ken Mackay and Lindsay Kline held out for 109 minutes. West Indies bowler Lance Gibbs took the only Test cricket hat-trick at the ground in Australia's first innings. (Scorecard)
 1975 – The first One-Day International match at the ground was between Australia and the West Indies. Australia won by 5 wickets. (Scorecard)
 1982 – In a Sheffield Shield game against Victoria, David Hookes hit a 43-minute, 34 ball century – by some metrics the fastest hundred in history. (Statistics)
 1991 – South Australia compiled the highest fourth innings winning total in Sheffield Shield history, reaching 6/506 (set 506 to win) against Queensland.
 1992 – The West Indies defeated Australia by one run in the fourth test of the Frank Worrell Trophy, when a bouncer by Courtney Walsh brushed Craig McDermott's glove to end a 40-run last-wicket partnership. It was the narrowest victory ever in Test cricket. (Scorecard)
 1997 – The first cricket match under lights was a One Day International between South Africa and New Zealand on 6 December 1997. (Scorecard)
 1999 – Sri Lankan spinner Muttiah Muralitharan was called for throwing by umpire Ross Emerson in a One Day International against England. The Sri Lankan team almost abandoned the match, but after instructions from the president of the Sri Lankan cricket board (relayed to captain Arjuna Ranatunga by mobile phone) the game resumed.
 2006 – During the Ashes series, many temporary stands were erected to cope with the demand for tickets. Stands were put between the Chappell stands and on the top of the hills. Australia beat England by 6 wickets on a remarkable last day. (Scorecard)
 2014 December 10 – Michael Clarke scored his 7th century on the ground, the most test cricket centuries at the ground.
 2015 November 27 – Adelaide Oval hosted the first ever day/night Test match, when Australia played New Zealand.
 2017 December 2 – Adelaide Oval hosted the first day/night Ashes Test.
 2018 February 4 – Adelaide Oval hosted its first Big Bash League Grand Final with the Adelaide Strikers defeating the Hobart Hurricanes for the Championship.
 2019 November 30 - David Warner breaks the record for most runs scored in a single test innings by an individual player at Adelaide Oval with a score of 335* against Pakistan, surpassing Donald Bradman's 299* in 1932.
2020 December 19 – India were all out for 36 on the third day of a test match against Australia in the second innings. This is India's lowest ever test score and the lowest ever test score recorded at the Adelaide Oval.

 Test cricket records 

 Batting 

 Bowling 

 Team records 

 Partnership records 

All records correct as of 23 December 2022.

Australian rules football

right|thumb|250px|In 1929 a women's Australian rules football match was witnessed by 41,000 spectators. A de Havilland Moth biplane dropped the game ball to start the match.right|thumb|250px| playing  for the 1971 Championship of Australia

From 1877 until the 1973 SANFL Grand Final, Adelaide Oval was the marquee ground for South Australian National Football League matches. After a dispute between cricket and SANFL administrators, Australian rules football in South Australia was moved to Football Park in the western suburbs of Adelaide until its permanent return to the ground in 2014. Adelaide Oval hosted the 1889 SAFA Grand Final, the first grand final in any Australian rules football competition after Port Adelaide and Norwood finished the 1889 SAFA season with the same win–loss–draw record. The record crowd for an Australian rules football match at Adelaide Oval was set at the 1965 SANFL Grand Final between Sturt and Port Adelaide when 62,543 saw the latter win by three points. After 1973 Australian rules football matches were sporadically held at the ground apart from South Adelaide games as that club continued to use the ground for their home matches after 1973. After the advent of the Australian Football League in 1990 only one AFL match was held at the ground before it was permanently adopted again by the code, with Port Adelaide hosting Melbourne during the last minor round match of the 2011 AFL season. As of 2014, all SANFL Finals Series matches are played at the ground including the SANFL Grand Final. Regular Australian Football League matches at the venue also began in 2014.

 Australian rules football timeline 
 1877 May 12 – The first South Australian Football Association match took place on the ground between the Old Adelaide Football Club and the Bankers Football Club. The original Adelaide club won the match 4 goals to 1.
 1877 August 18 – St Kilda became the first interstate club to play at Adelaide Oval defeating the original Adelaide Football Club by three goals.
 1885 July 1 – The first football game lit by electric light at the ground was conducted at night.
 1887 June 20 – After the previous two encounters between Norwood and Port Adelaide were drawn, the South Australia interest in their next meeting set a record for Australian rules football at the time with at least 11,000 spectators present. Attending the match were Chinese General Wong Yung Ho, Consul-General U. Tsing who were both accompanied by Dr. On Lee of Sydney and Mr. Way Lee of Adelaide. The Chinese commissioners were provided the private box of the Governor of South Australia William C. F. Robinson. Norwood won the match by two goals.
 1889 October 5 – The first Grand Final in a major Australian rules football competition was played between Norwood and Port Adelaide. Norwood won the game 7.4 (7) to 5.9 (5).
 1892 August 20 – A Broken Hill side was the first team from New South Wales to play at Adelaide Oval. Norwood would beat the visitors by four goals.
 1894 October 6 – The first drawn Grand Final in a major Australian rules football competition took place when Norwood and South Adelaide both finished on 4.8 (4). Norwood won the replay by a goal. 
 1909 July 10 – Boulder City become the first Western Australian club to play at Adelaide Oval. West Adelaide defeated the visitors by 17 points.
 1911 August 5 – The Australian Football Council Carnival was held at the ground for the first time and was won by South Australia. The competing leagues fielding representative sides were the SANFL, VFL, VFA, WANFL, TSL and NSW. This was the first time a Tasmanian side had played at Adelaide Oval. 
 1914 October 3 – Port Adelaide defeated the Carlton for a record fourth Championship of Australia title defeating the Victorian side by 34 points, 9.16 (70) to 5.6 (36).
 1929 – The record crowd for a women's Australian rules football match was set with 41,000 spectators present.
 1945 September 29 – Haydn Bunton Sr, triple Brownlow and Sandover medalist, played for Port Adelaide in the 1945 SANFL Grand Final, the only premiership decider of his career. Despite Port Adelaide obtaining a 32-point lead at quarter time, West Torrens would eventually win the match by 13 points.
 1965 October 2 – The 1965 SANFL Grand Final crowd set the record attendance for a sporting match at the venue with 62,543 people witnessing Port Adelaide defeat Sturt by three points.
 1972 October 15 – North Adelaide defeated Carlton to be crowned Champions of Australia defeating the Victorian side by one point being the last time a non-Victorian football side won a national championship until the West Coast Eagles won the 1992 AFL premiership.
 1973 September 29 – The 1973 SANFL Grand Final between North Adelaide and Glenelg was the last SANFL Grand Final at Adelaide Oval until 2014. Due to the advent of the national Australian Football League in 1990, effectively relegating the SANFL to second tier, it remains the last top flight Grand Final hosted at Adelaide Oval.
 1990 September 8 – The last game at the ground before the presence of an AFL team in South Australia was between West Torrens and Woodville with the latter winning by 45 points. The clubs would merge the following year.
 1996 July 20 – The last game at the ground involving 's senior team before entering the AFL was against  Sturt with the former side winning by 40 points.
 2011 September 4 – The first Australian Football League match at the venue was played between Port Adelaide and Melbourne. Port Adelaide won the match by 8 points.
Port Adelaide won the game by 55 points.
Port Adelaide won by 57 points.
2019 March 31 – The first AFLW Grand Final to be held at the ground featured the Adelaide Crows defeating Carlton by 45 points.

Australian rules football records
The first senior league Australian rules football match was played on Adelaide Oval in 1877 between the original Adelaide club and the Bankers club. The records below cover senior Australian rules football at Adelaide Oval. These records include the South Australian league football (known as the South Australian Football Association and South Australian Football League and the South Australian National Football League) from 1877 when the first premiership matches were held at the ground until the end of the 1990 SANFL season, the last year that the competition was the highest level of Australian rules football in South Australia. In 1991 the newly created Adelaide Crows entered the Australian Football League subsequently playing the highest level of football in the state. Port Adelaide would join the Australian Football League in 1997. 

 Individual (Men) 

 Most goals in a game by a player 

 Most career goals by a player 

 Most career games by a player 

 Team (men) 

 Most consecutive wins by a club at the ground 

 Highest team score 

 Largest single-quarter score 

 Largest winning margin 

Before 1897 behinds were not included in the final score. During these matches the margins were 30 and 27 goals.

 Lowest team score 

 Individual (women) 

 Most goals in a game 

 Most goals in a career 

 Team (women) 

 Highest team score 

 Rugby League 

In 1991, the NSWRL came to Adelaide Oval when the St. George Dragons played the Balmain Tigers on a cold and wet Friday night under temporary lights in the first of five games that the Dragons would play at the oval over the next five years. That game, with the Dragons winning 16–2, set a rugby league record crowd for the ground when 28,884 people attended, and was in fact the highest minor round attendance for the 1991 NSWRL season (beaten only by four of the six Finals series games including the Grand Final). In 1997 Adelaide got its own side in the much vaunted (but short lived) Super League competition with the Adelaide Rams. Their first home game attracted their record crowd when 27,435 saw the Rams defeat SL's other new team, the Hunter Mariners 10–8. However, after disputes over money (and dwindling crowds due to poor on-field results) they left the ground in 1998 and moved to Hindmarsh Stadium. In the 2010 and 2011 National Rugby League seasons, Sydney club the Canterbury-Bankstown Bulldogs played home games at the Oval against the Melbourne Storm. The Bulldogs had intended to make Adelaide Oval their second "home" (the club plays its home games at Sydney's Olympic Stadium), but the plan was abandoned after 2010. On 20 November 2016, it was announced that the Sydney Roosters will take on the Melbourne Storm in the 2017 NRL season meaning that top level Rugby league returned to Adelaide for the first time since 2011. The Roosters won the game, played on 24 June in Round 16 of the season, 25–24 in golden point extra time in front of a crowd of 21,492 fans.

It was announced in February 2018 that the Oval would host one State of Origin match in 2020.

Rugby League timeline
 1991 June 28 – The St. George Dragons defeated the Balmain Tigers in front of 28,884 spectators during the 1991 NSWRL season.
 1997 March 14 – The short-lived Adelaide Rams won their first home game 10–8 against the Hunter Mariners in the 1997 Super League.
 2020 November 4 – A NRL State of Origin match was scheduled to be held at Adelaide Oval on 1 June for the opening leg of the 2020 NRL State of Origin series but was postponed due to the ongoing impact of the COVID-19 pandemic which affected the 2020 NRL season. Queensland ended up winning the rescheduled game 18–14.

 Soccer 

Adelaide United FC have played a number of A-League home games against Sydney FC and Melbourne Victory FC. Adelaide Oval was the site of an international friendly match between the Socceroos and New Zealand on 5 June 2011. On 25 July 2014, Adelaide United played its first game at the fully re-developed Adelaide Oval when it played host to Spanish La Liga side Málaga CF. In front of 23,254 fans and a television audience in Spain, Málaga defeated the Reds 5–1.

 Soccer timeline 
 1904 July 20 – The South Australian British Football Association beat the crew aboard  9–0.
 1920 July 5 – During a visit by the Prince of Wales, a soccer match was organised between the South Australian British Football Association'' and the crew aboard the visiting  with the game resulting in a draw 0–0.
 1924 October 6 – Over the course of a day three codes were played on Adelaide Oval, Australian rules football, rugby and soccer. The soccer match was between two teams, one called "Adelaide United" and the other "Hindmarsh" with the latter team winning 2–0.
 1925 – During a tour of Australia, the English Soccer team was prevented from playing on Adelaide Oval by ground administrators.
 1937 July 29 – England beat South Australia 10–0.
 1951 June 23 – England beat Australia 13–1. Ike Clarke scored four goals.
 1958 May 24 – English First Division club Blackpool beat Australia 1–0.
 1959 June 6 – Heart of Midlothian beat Australia 6–0.
 2007 December 28 – Adelaide United play Sydney FC in first A-League match held at the ground.
 2011 June 5 – Australia beat New Zealand 3–0.
 2014 July 25 – La Liga side Málaga CF beat Adelaide United 5–1.
 2015 July 20 – Premier League side Liverpool beat Adelaide United 2–0 in front of 53,008 spectators.
 2016 March 24 – Australia beat Tajikistan 7–0 in a FIFA World Cup qualifier in front of 35,439 spectators.
 2016 May 1 – The first A-League Grand Final hosted at the ground saw Adelaide United beat Western Sydney Wanderers in front of 50,119 fans.
 2017 June 8 – Australia beat Saudi Arabia 3–2 in a FIFA World Cup qualifier in front of 29,785 spectators.

Cycling 
From the first cycling race held at Adelaide Oval in 1882 until the last in 1910 when the administration of Adelaide Oval placed a fence on the inside of the track, Adelaide Oval regularly hosted cycling races that attracted tens of thousands of spectators. During the 1903 Walne Stakes at Adelaide Oval famous professional American cyclist Major Taylor won the event.

Cycling timeline 
 1882 – The first bicycle race took place on Adelaide Oval during part of a Scottish sport fete on Easter Monday that attracted a then record 15,000 spectators over the course of the day.
 1885 – The first time the Intercolonial Bicycle Championship was held at Adelaide Oval. F.H. Shackleford won the premier 10-mile race in 34 minutes 30 seconds. A.L. Henzel won the women's 3-mile bracelet race in 9 minutes 43 seconds.
 1903 – American professional cyclist Major Taylor wins the Walne Stakes in front of at least 10,000 spectators. He won the half-mile in a time of 57s ± 2.5. Marshall Taylor's trip to Australia to compete in cycling races inspired the 1992 film Tracks of Glory.

Rugby union 

Adelaide Oval hosted two games of the 2003 Rugby World Cup. On 25 October, The Wallabies played their first international game in Adelaide when they defeated Namibia 142–0 in front of 28,196 fans. The next day Ireland defeated Argentina 16–15 in front of 30,203 fans.

On 3 July 2004, The Wallabies hosted the Pacific Islanders at Adelaide Oval, winning 29–14 before a crowd of 19,266.

Adelaide Oval did not host another rugby union match until 27 August 2022, when Australia defeated South Africa 25–17 in a Rugby Championship test match in front of a crowd of 36,336.

Rugby Sevens 
From 2007 until 2010, Adelaide Oval hosted the Australia Sevens event in the IRB Sevens World Series.

Rugby Union timeline 
 1888 July 16 – England defeated South Australia 28–3 in a Rugby Union match.
 2003 October 25 – The first of two matches of the Rugby World Cup were played at Adelaide Oval. The first match saw Australia thrash Namibia 142–0. The following day Ireland defeated Argentina by one point.

Baseball 

In 1888, American Baseball administrator Albert Spalding brought the Chicago team and an additional composite team called the All-Americans  to Australia and would play a series of three exhibition matches at Adelaide Oval. Chicago would win the Adelaide series 2–1. Following on from this exhibition of the match in Australia, over the next few years intercolonial matches were commonly played against other states on the ground.

Baseball timeline 
 1888 December – American Baseball administrator Albert Spalding brought the Chicago team and an additional composite team called the All-American team to Australia and played a series of three exhibition matches at the ground. Chicago would win the series 2–1.
 1934 August 12 – The final game of the inaugural 1934 Claxton Shield series was played between Victoria and South Australia with the latter state winning 5–8.
 1947 – Adelaide Oval was used for some matches of the 1947 Claxton Shield.
 1951 – Adelaide Oval was used for some matches of the 1951 Claxton Shield.

American football 

During World War II an American football match was held by American soldiers stationed in Adelaide on Independence Day. At least 25,000 spectators attended the match that was staged between teams referred to as the "Packers" and "Bears" with the latter winning the match.

American football timeline 
 13 June 1938 – During an interval of a Port Adelaide and Norwood SANFL match with 27,764 spectators present, a long distance kicking contest was held using American footballs. Measurements of kicks were then compared to College footballers in the United States. Robert Elliott of North Adelaide won the competition kicking an Australian football 67 meters. Robert Elliott kicked the American football 62 meters, 13 centimetres short of the top American figure set by Jack Cohen from the UCLA Bruins using the American ball.
 4 July 1942 – An exhibition match was held by American soldiers.

Tennis 
The Adelaide Oval grounds have maintained a long tradition of holding tennis tournaments.

Tennis timeline 
 1889 – The inaugural South Australian Tennis Championships are staged at the Oval tennis courts.
 1910 – The Australasian Tennis Championships are staged for the first time at the oval the title is won by Rodney Heath.
 1920 – Australasian Tennis Championships are staged at the oval for the second time, won by Pat O'Hara Wood.

Field hockey 

Hockey was first played at Adelaide Oval in the early 1900s.

Field hockey timeline 
1904 September 3 – The premiers of the South Australian Hockey Association played a composite team of the best players from the remaining clubs.
1905 July 15 – The first women's hockey match held at the ground was played.
1926 – The Indian army hockey team defeat South Australia 14–0.
1939 August 22 – Australian state hockey championship held at Adelaide Oval.

Other sports 
Aside from the main sports of cricket and Australian rules football, 14 sports have been played at one time or another at the oval: Highland games, lacrosse, quoits, and Motorcycle racing.

Other uses 
As part of the 1927 Royal Tour, the Duke and Duchess of York had a motorcade through Adelaide Oval with many people present for the event.

In 1885 an Indigenous corroboree was held at the ground attracting 20,000 spectators to one of the nights. Religious gatherings have previously been held at the ground. Adelaide Oval also provides an array of functions throughout the year.

Due to the COVID-19 pandemic, the Adelaide Christmas Pageant was held at Adelaide Oval to a permitted audience of 25,000 in 2020, and 16,000 in 2021. Tickets were drawn from a raffle, and the pageant was held in the evening. The 2022 pageant is expected to return to the streets, although Adelaide Oval has been reserved in the event of another variant.

Concerts
Adelaide Oval has regularly been host to large outdoor concerts. Due to its high profile, proximity to the CBD and Adelaide Railway station and lack of competition for facilities of its scale in Adelaide it has often been the choice of international musicians looking to host large concerts.

List of concerts at Adelaide Oval

Attendance records

Attendance records (outright)

Attendance records (by event type)

Attendance record (sport)

Attendance record (sport excluding Cricket and Australian rules)

Attendance records (concerts)

Statues

Transport access (CGP)

See also

 Disappearance of Joanne Ratcliffe and Kirste Gordon
 List of Australian Football League grounds
 List of Test cricket grounds
 List of international cricket centuries at the Adelaide Oval
 List of international cricket five-wicket hauls at the Adelaide Oval
 List of Australian rules football statues, a list of Australian rules football-related statues across Australia

References

External links

 
 Adelaide Oval historical time line 1871 to present

1871 establishments in Australia
Test cricket grounds in Australia
Rugby union stadiums in Australia
Sports venues in Adelaide
Rugby league stadiums in Australia
Australian Football League grounds
Multi-purpose stadiums in Australia
Sports venues completed in 1871
1992 Cricket World Cup stadiums
Boxing venues in Australia
Adelaide Strikers (WBBL)
Adelaide Park Lands
Adelaide Strikers
2015 Cricket World Cup stadiums
Soccer venues in South Australia
World Rugby Sevens Series venues